Eva María Dimas Fontanals (born 18 March 1973 in San Salvador) is a retired female athlete and weightlifter from El Salvador.

Biography
She competed for her native Central American country in three consecutive Summer Olympics, starting in 2000. Dimas is a niece of Valerio Fontanals. She carried the flag for El Salvador at the opening ceremony of the 2008 Summer Olympics in Beijing, PR China.

Previously Dimas competed as a discus thrower, finishing in 31st place at the 1995 World Championships.

Dimas tested positive for the banned steroid Nandrolone in June 2009 and was banned from competing for two years.

References

External links
 
 
 
 

1973 births
Living people
Salvadoran female discus throwers
Salvadoran female weightlifters
Olympic weightlifters of El Salvador
Weightlifters at the 1999 Pan American Games
Weightlifters at the 2003 Pan American Games
Weightlifters at the 2007 Pan American Games
Weightlifters at the 2000 Summer Olympics
Weightlifters at the 2004 Summer Olympics
Weightlifters at the 2008 Summer Olympics
Sportspeople from San Salvador
Pan American Games silver medalists for El Salvador
Pan American Games bronze medalists for El Salvador
Doping cases in weightlifting
Pan American Games medalists in weightlifting
Central American and Caribbean Games silver medalists for El Salvador
Competitors at the 2006 Central American and Caribbean Games
World Athletics Championships athletes for El Salvador
Central American Games gold medalists for El Salvador
Central American Games medalists in athletics
Central American Games bronze medalists for El Salvador
Central American and Caribbean Games medalists in weightlifting
Medalists at the 2007 Pan American Games